James 'Daisy' Bell (1883–1962) was a professional footballer who played as an inside forward.

Career stats
Grangetown 1900 - 1904, record unknown,
Middlesbrough 1904 - 1905, 10 games, 4 goals,
Eston United 1905 - 1906, record unknown,
Barrow 1906 - 1908, 76 games, 34 goals,
Exeter City 1908 - 1911, 119 games, 63 goals,
Portsmouth 1911, 4 games, 2 goals,
Barrow 1911 - 1917, 146 games, 78 goals, (during season 1911/1912 around only half of clubs goalscorers recorded)

Exeter City F.C. players
1883 births
1962 deaths
Association football inside forwards
Middlesbrough F.C. players
Barrow A.F.C. players
Portsmouth F.C. players
English footballers